John Anthony Fonblanque  (12 June 1759 – 4 January 1837) was an English politician and barrister.

Early life and name
Born John Anthony Fonblanque, he was the son of Jean de Grenier de Fonblanque, a banker, naturalised as Jean Fonblanque, 

He was educated at Harrow School and Oxford. In 1828, late in life, he changed his surname by royal licence to de Grenier Fonblanque. He was descended from a Huguenot family, his father having exchanged the surname de Grenier de Fonblanque for that of Fonblanque on his naturalisation in England.

Career
He was commissioned as a Ensign in the Berkshire Militia in 1780. The regiment was disembodied in March 1783. 

Called to the bar at the Middle Temple, 24 January 1783, Fonblanque distinguished himself in 1791 as leading counsel at the bar of the House of Commons on behalf of the merchants of London in opposition to the Quebec bill.

Fonblanque was the author of the very extensive notes forming the useful body of the standard legal work, Treatise on Equity nominally ascribed to Henry Ballow. First published in 1792, the fifth edition appeared in 1820.

He was Member of Parliament (MP) for the borough of Camelford 1802–1806 as a member of the Whig party following members of his wife's family, Samuel Martin and Sir Ralph Payne. Financial troubles brought an end to his political career by 1810.

He was one of the Whig "friends" of King George IV when Prince of Wales and is also said to have been a personal friend of his Royal Highness. He is supposed to have written the celebrated letters to the King on the subject of his Royal Highness's exclusion from the army which were generally attributed to Lord Moira.

Made King's Counsel on 28 April 1804, his brilliant early reputation meant he was spoken of as a future Whig Lord Chancellor. Vanity led Fonblanque into debt in 1807–08, and money problems, his wife left him in 1834, remained with him and his family the rest of his life. In later years he withdrew a great deal from the profession.  It was said that Lord Eldon hearing that his library was to be sold purchased it and presented it to him.

Family
John Anthony Fonblanque died on 4 January 1837 in his 77th year, still confined to the area just outside the debtors' prison, retaining his faculties to the last and "with perfect resignation".

On 30 May 1786, he married  Frances Caroline Fitzgerald (1760–1844), sister of the poet William Thomas Fitzgerald and daughter of Colonel John Austen Fitzgerald and Henrietta Martin sister of Samuel Martin, and with her he was father of:
John Samuel Martin Fonblanque (March 1787 – 2 November 1865).
Thomas Fonblanque (26 January 1793 – 1861), Her Britannic Majesty's Consul General and Chargé d'Affaires in Serbia and father of historian Edward Barrington de Fonblanque of the War Office.
Albany Fonblanque (1 October 1794 – 13 October 1872).
Three daughters : Caroline, Harriott and Eliza.

Publications
A serious exhortation to the Electors of Great Britain House of Commons, 1791
Thoughts on the Canada Bill, Now Depending in Parliament 1791
A Treatise on Equity, with the addition of marginal references and notes in two volumes, 1792 (5th edition J & W T Clarke, 1820)
The case of Samuel Howe Showers Esq., Lieutenant Colonel in the military service of the East India Company at Calcutta to which is subjoined the opinions of Mr. Erskine and Mr. Fonblanque thereon 1796
Doubts as to the expediency of adopting the recommendation of the bullion committee 1810
The revised opinion of John Fonblanque on the case of the Baron de Bode 1834 (a dispute concerning compensation for lands seized in France during the revolution)

Notes

References
A Memoir of Mr Fonblanque, The Legal Observer 14 January 1837
Obituary, J de G Fonblanque Esq. The Gentleman's Magazine March 1837
Michael Lobban, 'Fonblanque, John de Grenier (1759–1837)', Oxford Dictionary of National Biography, online edn, Oxford University Press, Sept 2004
 R. G. Thorne, The History of Parliament: The House of Commons, 1790–1820, Boydell & Brewer, 1986.
Emma Elizabeth Thoyts, History of the Royal Berkshire Militia (Now 3rd Battalion Royal Berks Regiment), Sulhamstead, Berks, 1897/Scholar Select, ISBN 978-1-37645405-5

External links
 

1759 births
1837 deaths
Royal Berkshire Militia officers
Members of the Parliament of the United Kingdom for Camelford
UK MPs 1801–1802
UK MPs 1802–1806
Members of the Inner Temple
Ambassadors of the United Kingdom to Serbia
People educated at Harrow School
Whig (British political party) MPs for English constituencies
English people of French descent
De Fonblanque family